Hyperlais transversalis is a species of moth in the family Crambidae described by Wolfram Mey in 2011. It is found in Namibia.

References

Moths described in 2011
Cybalomiinae